The Sikorsky S-72 was an experimental compound helicopter developed by helicopter manufacturer Sikorsky Aircraft.

Design and development

RSRA

The Rotor Systems Research Aircraft (RSRA) was developed by Sikorsky for NASA and the Army. The RSRA was developed to allow the inflight measurement of helicopter rotor characteristics. The airframe was developed using an existing Sikorsky S-61 main rotor, an S-61 roller gearbox, and a highly modified Sikorsky S-67 airframe. In addition, it could fly as a fixed-wing aircraft without a main rotor.

Unique among helicopters of its time, it was fitted with a crew emergency extraction system. This system, when activated, fired explosive bolts that severed the main rotor blades, escape panels were blown off the roof of the aircraft, then the crew was extracted using rockets.

The RSRA was a unique pure research aircraft developed to fill the void between design analysis, wind tunnel testing, and flight results of rotor aircraft. The joint NASA/Army project began in December 1970, first flight on October 12, 1976 with the first of two aircraft arriving from Sikorsky to NASA on February 11, 1979.

One notable test performed with the RSRA was the use of the main and tail rotor load measurement system to determine the vertical drag of the airframe.

In 1981, NASA and the US Army solicited proposals for fitting a four-bladed main rotor to the RSRA. Sikorsky proposed fitting a UH-60A main rotor to the RSRA in their proposal, while Hughes Helicopters proposed fitting a YAH-64A main rotor and Boeing Vertol proposed fitting a YUH-61A OR Model 347 (four-blade CH-47) main rotor. In the end, this program did not proceed.

The X-Wing

The X-Wing circulation control rotor concept was developed in the mid-1970s by the David W. Taylor Naval Ship Research and Development Center under DARPA funding. In October 1976, Lockheed Corporation won a DARPA contract to develop a large-scale rotor to test the concept.

Intended to take off vertically like a helicopter, the craft's rigid rotors could be stopped in mid-flight to act as X-shaped wings to provide additional lift during forward flight, as well as having more conventional wings. Instead of controlling lift by altering the angle of attack of its blades as more conventional helicopters do, the craft used compressed air fed from the engines and expelled from its blades to generate a virtual wing surface, similar to blown flaps on a conventional platform. Computerized valves made sure the compressed air came from the correct edge of the rotor, the correct edge changing as the rotor rotated.

In late 1983, Sikorsky received a contract to modify one S-72 RSRA into a demonstration testbed for the X-Wing rotor system. The modified airframe was rolled out in 1986 and while many of the aircraft's technical issues had been resolved, with plans for it to begin flight tests with the rotor/wing system, it never flew and budgetary requirements meant that the program was cancelled in 1988.

The X-Wing was conceived as a complement rather than replacement for helicopters and fixed-wing aircraft, intended to be used in roles such as air-to-air and air-to-ground operations, as well as airborne early warning, search and rescue and anti-submarine warfare, as these roles could take advantage of the aircraft's ability to hover and manoeuvre as low speeds while also cruising at high speeds.

Specifications (S-72)

See also

References

External links

 X-Wing Research Vehicle on NASA.gov
 S-72 on helis.com
 Robb, Raymond L. (2006). Hybrid helicopters: Compounding the quest for speed, Vertiflite. Summer 2006. American Helicopter Society.  Size: 25 pages in 2MB. Archive

Experimental helicopters
S-072
Stoppable rotor helicopters
1980s United States experimental aircraft
1980s United States helicopters
VTOL aircraft
Twin-turbine helicopters
Compound helicopters
Twinjets
Aircraft first flown in 1976